Distant Light is the third studio album by Australian singer-songwriter Alex Lloyd. It was released in September 2003, and peaked at number 9 on the ARIA Charts and it was certified gold.

At the ARIA Music Awards of 2004, the album was nominated for two awards.

Background and released 
On the Chaos Music website, Lloyd states that the album is based on homesickness after a long stretch on the road promoting his second album Watching Angels Mend. "That was the headspace of where I was at the time. We went to a lot of strange places, maybe places I don’t want to revisit. It was a pretty lonely time. I think I’d reached a point where I’d just travelled too much."

Distant Light features Jim Moginie and Martin Rotsey of Midnight Oil on several tracks. It was produced by Stuart Miller, who had also produced Watching Angels Mend and mixed by Tony Hoffer who has worked with Air, Beck and Turin Brakes.

Track listing
"Hello the End" – 3:53
"Distant Light" – 4:02
"Coming Home" – 3:06
"Far Away" – 4:20
"1000 Miles" – 3:02
"Save My Soul" – 3:56
"Ordinary Boy" – 4:12
"Beautiful" – 3:22
"This Is a Call" – 4:07
"Chasing The Sun" – 2:55
"Light Is On" – 3:45
"What's Wrong" – 3:49
"America" – 3:33

Charts

Personnel 

Michael Barker – percussion, drums
Andrew Bickers – horn
Felix Bloxom – percussion, drums
Brent Clark – engineer
Sam Dixon – bass
George Ellis Choir – chorus
Georgia Ellis – string copyist
Brian "Big Bass" Gardener – mastering
Barbara Griffin – keyboards, backing vocals
Stuart Hunter – keyboards, horn arrangements
Alex Hewitson – double bass
Tony Hoffer – mixing
Kinnon Holt – guitar
Andrew Bickers – saxophone
Anthony Kable – trombone
Stewart Kirwan – trumpet
Alex Lloyd – bass, guitar, keyboards, vocals, producer, horn arrangements, string arrangements
Stuart Miller – producer
Jim Moginie – guitar, keyboards
Simon Moor – A&R
Kim Moyes – vibraphone
Shane Nicholson – guitar, backing vocals
John O'Donnell – A&R
Benny Quinn – creative director
Terepai Richmond – percussion, drums
Michel Rose – pedal steel
Martin Rotsey – guitar
Luke Steele – guitar
Simon Weller – photography

References

Alex Lloyd albums
EMI Records albums
2003 albums